Gnarwolves is the eponymously-titled debut album by the British punk rock band Gnarwolves, released on 15 September 2014.

Iona Cairns of the band Great Cynics features on the song 'Eat Dynamite, Kid' as an additional vocalist. At the end of 'Eat Dynamite, Kid' there is a secret track referred to as 'the hardcore song' which features Lewis Johns on guitar.

Reception

The album peaked at number 68 in the UK album chart in its first week of release and number 4 in the Rock album chart.

Aaron Kent of 7BitArcade called the album 'excellent' stating the debut album to be 'a lot better than most bands achieve three or four albums in'. Kent claimed 'Gnarwolves may be the most authentic, consistent new band on the punk circuit currently, and their self-titled debut album only fulfils this promise' giving the album a very positive review.

Track listing

Personnel
Gnarwolves
Thom Weeks - Vocals/Guitar
Charlie Piper - Vocals/Bass
Max Weeks - Drums

References

2014 debut albums
Big Scary Monsters Recording Company albums
Gnarwolves albums
Pure Noise Records albums